Jenő Gerbovits (13 May 192524 August 2011) was a Hungarian politician and member of the National Assembly of Hungary between 1990 and 1994. He served as Minister without portfolio for Compensation in the cabinet of József Antall. He was a member of the Independent Smallholders, Agrarian Workers and Civic Party.

Gerbovits died in a farm accident on 24 August 2011 in his birthplace. According to the police press officer the retired politician was driving his homemade tractor on his land in Zics (Somogy County) when the vehicle overturned on a slope, burying him underneath. He died at the scene.

References

External links
 Bölöny, József – Hubai, László: Magyarország kormányai 1848–2004 [Cabinets of Hungary 1848–2004], Akadémiai Kiadó, Budapest, 2004 (5th edition).
 Zsigmond Király Főiskola - Jelenkutató Csoport

1925 births
2011 deaths
Government ministers of Hungary
Members of the National Assembly of Hungary (1990–1994)
Independent Smallholders, Agrarian Workers and Civic Party politicians
Accidental deaths in Hungary
Farming accident deaths
People from Somogy County